The following lists events that happened during 2003 in Indonesia.

Incumbents

Events

April
 April 4 – A raid was launched by an unidentified mob, against the armory of the Wamena District of the Indonesian Army, which was followed by a sweeping operation and forced relocation of civilians around Wamena by the Indonesian Army and the Indonesian National Police.

August
 August 5 – A car bomb exploded at the Marriott Hotel in Jakarta, Indonesia, killing 12 people and injuring 150.

December
 December 31 – A bombing, which occurred during a concert at a night market in Peureulak, Nanggroe Aceh Darussalam province, Indonesia, killed at least 10 people, including three children, and wounded 45 others.

Births

 May 29 – Priska Madelyn Nugroho, Indonesian tennis player
 June 21 – Adhisty Zara, Indonesian singer, performer and actress
 June 21 – Lyodra Ginting, Indonesian singer

Deaths

March
 March 21 – Umar Wirahadikusumah, 4th Vice President of Indonesia (b. 1924)

April
 April 4 – Abdul Kadir, Indonesian footballer (b. 1948)
 April 13 – Farouk Afero, Pakistani-born Indonesian film actor (b. 1939)

May
 May 6 – Ateng, Indonesian actor and comedian (b. 1942)

August
 August 16 – Ben Mang Reng Say, Indonesian politician (b. 1928)

December
 December 29 – Ersa Siregar, Indonesian reporter and journalist, shot dead in a shootout between TNI and GAM (b. 1955)

References

 
Indonesia
Years of the 21st century in Indonesia
2000s in Indonesia
Indonesia